Dorothea Klumpke Roberts (August 9, 1861 in San Francisco – October 5, 1942 in San Francisco) was an American astronomer. She was Director of the Bureau of Measurements at the Paris Observatory and was made a Chevalier de la Légion d'Honneur.

Biography 
Her father, John Gerard Klumpke (1825–1917), was a German immigrant who had come to California in 1850 with the Gold Rush and had later become a successful realtor in San Francisco. He married Dorothea Mathilda Tolle in 1855 and they produced a family of five daughters and two sons. In 1877 she moved to Paris, France while her four sisters were placed in schools in Germany and Switzerland. The sisters all went on to distinguished careers: Anna Elizabeth Klumpke, painter and companion to the great French animal painter Rosa Bonheur; Julia Klumpke, a violinist and composer; Mathilda, an accomplished pianist and pupil of Marmontel; and the neurologist Augusta, who, with her physician husband, Joseph Jules Dejerine, established a clinic and wrote numerous papers.

Dorothea studied at the University of Paris and started out also studying music, but later turned to astronomy. She received her bachelor's degree in 1886. She also earned her PhD from University of Paris, which she completed in 1893, and her dissertation was about the rings of Saturn. In 1887 she took up a post at the Paris Observatory. Here she worked with Guillaume Bigourdan and Lipót Schulhof, and later with the pioneer astrophotographers Paul and Prosper Henry, who were working with a 34 cm refractor and photographing the minor planets (asteroids). Her work consisted of measuring star positions, processing astrophotographs, studying stellar spectra and meteorites.

Work 
In 1886 Sir David Gill proposed an atlas of the heavens. The idea received enthusiastic support, especially from the Director of the Paris Observatory, Admiral Amédée Mouchez, who suggested an international meeting in Paris. This led to the Carte du Ciel project which required photographing the entire sky and showing stars as faint as the 14th magnitude. The Paris Observatory was to do a major portion of the sky as its contribution. It was also envisioned that a catalogue of all the stars to the 11th magnitude be drawn up.

Despite being a woman, and in the face of fierce competition from 50 men, she secured the post of Director of the Bureau of Measurements (Bureau des Mesures) at the Paris Observatory. Dorothea held this position for a decade and supervised several other women scientists during this time.

In 1896 she sailed to Norway on the Norwegian vessel Norse King, to observe the solar eclipse of August 9, 1896. The eclipse was not a success because of obscuring clouds, but romance was about to enter her life. She met up with Dr. Isaac Roberts, a 67-year-old Welsh widower and entrepreneur turned astronomer, who had become a pioneer in astrophotography. He had attended the Paris Carte du Ciel Congress. Roberts had equipped his private observatory with a 50 cm reflector and camera, and a 13 cm Cooke refractor.

In 1899, astronomers had predicted a great meteor shower now known as the Leonids. The French chose a female astronomer - Dorothea Klumpke - to be the one to ride in a balloon to observe the shower - the shower turned out a complete failure.

Five years after meeting, Dorothea and Isaac were married in 1901 and stayed at his Sussex home. Dorothea left her job at the Paris Observatory in order to be with Isaac, whom she assisted in a project to photograph all 52 of the Herschel "areas of nebulosity." Their marriage ended after only a short while with Isaac's death in 1904. Dorothea inherited all his astronomical effects and a considerable fortune.

Dorothea remained at the Sussex home and completed photography of the 52 areas, after which she went to stay with her mother and sister, Anna, at Chateau Rosa Bonheur, taking along the entire set of photographic plates. She returned to Paris Observatory and spent 25 years processing the plates and Isaac's notes, periodically publishing papers on the results. In 1929 she published a comprehensive catalogue of the survey "The Isaac Roberts Atlas of 52 Regions, a Guide to William Herschel's Fields of Nebulosity". She was awarded the Hèléne-Paul Helbronner prize in 1932 from the French Academy of Sciences for this publication.

Through a donation of Dorothea in honor of her late husband, the Société astronomique de France (the French Astronomical Society) established the Prix Dorothea Klumpke-Isaac Roberts for the encouragement of the study of the wide and diffuse nebulae of William Herschel, the obscure objects of Barnard, or the cosmic clouds of R.P. Hagen. This biennial prize was first given in 1931 and continues today.

Dorothea Klumpke died on October 5, 1942, having been in poor health for a number of years.

About signals from Mars 
"The body of Mars is not very luminous, and the eye has to be trained. Imagination must not be permitted to carry eye away. The astronomers at Arizona Observatory are very advanced, and imagination may have played a part, though Mars should be the first planet with which we shall be able to communicate. Mars will be the first to give us a true knowledge of life beyond the earth, as it was the first to lead Keppler to the truth about the solar system. The projections are astronomical phenomena, not signals from the inhabitants. Mars is doubtless inhabited by a superior race, and I see probability in Kant's theory that we may be transmitted to another planet for another life."

Honors 
She was the first recipient of the "Prix de Dames" from the Société astronomique de France in 1897, and in 1893 was made an Officier d'Académe of the French Academy of Sciences - up to that time, these honours had not been awarded to a woman. On December 14, 1893 she read her doctoral thesis, "L'étude des Anneaux de Saturne" to a large audience of academics at the Sorbonne, and was awarded the degree of Docteur ès Sciences; the first woman to do so. Her main subjects were mathematics and mathematical astronomy. The examining committee, composed of Dr. Jean Gaston Darboux and Drs. Félix Tisserand and Marie Henri Andoyer were unanimous in their praise. By way of contrast, Harvard awarded its first doctorate in astronomy to Cecilia Payne-Gaposchkin in 1925.

On February 22, 1934, she was elected a Chevalière de la Légion d'Honneur with the French President himself presenting the Cross. Shortly after the award, she and Anna moved to San Francisco where she spent the rest of her days. She made endowments to the Paris Observatory, the Astronomical Society of the Pacific, and the University of California to be granted to aspiring astronomers. Asteroids 339 Dorothea and 1040 Klumpkea were named in her honor, as is the Klumpke-Roberts Award of the Astronomical Society of the Pacific.

See also
Timeline of women in science

References

External links 
 
 J. H. Reynolds: Obituary Notice: Dorothea Klumpke Roberts. Monthly Notices of the Royal Astronomical Society, Vol. 104 (1944), p. 92.
 R. G. Aitken: Dorothea Klumpke Roberts – An Appreciation. Publications of the Astronomical Society of the Pacific, Vol. 54 (1942), No. 321, p. 217.

20th-century French astronomers
1861 births
1942 deaths
American women astronomers
Scientists from California
Chevaliers of the Légion d'honneur
Fellows of the Royal Astronomical Society
Use mdy dates from August 2011
University of Paris alumni
People from San Francisco
American people of German descent
American expatriates in France
19th-century French astronomers
19th-century American women scientists